Hailu (Amharic: ኃይሉ) is a male name of Ethiopian origin that may refer to:

Hailu Shawul (born 1936), Ethiopian engineer and the chairman of the Coalition for Unity and Democracy 
Hailu Tekle Haymanot (1868–1950), Ethiopian army commander and nobleman
Hailu Mekonnen (born 1980), Ethiopian long-distance runner and two-time World Cross Country medallist
Aynalem Hailu (born 1986), Ethiopian footballer
Hailu Negussie (born 1978), Ethiopian marathon runner and 2005 Boston Marathon winner
Hailu Yimenu (died 1991), Ethiopian Prime Minister
Meseret Hailu (born 1990), Ethiopian female long-distance runner and world half marathon champion
Kassa Hailu (1818–1868), birth name of Ethiopian Emperor Tewodros II

See also
Haifeng dialect of Hakka, also known as Hailu or Haiufeng
Haile (disambiguation)
Hailuoto
Were Ilu, a town in north-central Ethiopia also known as Warra Hailu

Amharic-language names